Baron Philippe Roberts-Jones (8 November 1924 – 9 August 2016) was a Belgian art historian who was the head of conservation of the Royal Museums of Fine Arts of Belgium. A member of the Royal Academy of Science, Letters and Fine Arts of Belgium, of which he was president in 1980, he was also a member of the Free Academy of Belgium and a professor at the Université libre de Bruxelles. He was also a published poet.

Biography 
Born in Ixelles, Belgium, on 8 November 1924, Philippe Roberts-Jones belonged to a family of three generations of lawyers, descending from a British family established in Brussels at the beginning of the 19th century and that had been active in the coachwork industry.

His father Robert Roberts-Jones (1893–1943), a lawyer, was a member of the Belgian Resistance and was executed by the Germans at the Tir national on 20 October 1943.

Philippe Roberts-Jones died on 9 August 2016 at the age of 91.

Prizes 
Prix Émile Polak from the Belgian Royal Academy of French Language and Literature, 1957, for Amour et autres visages
Prix Malherbe of the Province of Brabant, 1976, for L'Art Majeur
Prix du rayonnement de la langue française, from the Académie française, 1980, for his collected output
Grand prix de poésie de l'Académie française, 1985
Prix Louis-Guillaume for prose poetry, 2002, for Domaines en cours
Grand prix international Lucian Blaga, 2006

Distinctions 
Robert-Jones was made a Baron by King Baudouin in 1988.

Belgium 
Grand Cross of the Order of the Crown
Grand Officer of the Order of Leopold
Volunteers' Medal for War
Commemorative Medal of the 1940–1945 War, with sabres
Civic Medal, first class

France 
Commandeur of the Légion d'honneur
Commandeur of the ordre des Arts et des Lettres

Spain
Commander of the Order of Isabella the Catholic

 Italy 
Commander of the Order of Merit of the Republic of Italy

 Finland 
Grand Officer of the Order of the Lion of Finland

Work 
As a poet he publishes under the name Philippe Jones.  Among his published works are:
Le Voyageur de la nuit
Amours et autres visages
Être selon
Racine ouverte
Un espace renoué

As an art historian, he was interested in the work  of Honoré Daumier and in contemporary engraving; another field of interest of his was the work of Belgian painter Lismonde.

Bibliography 

1973: L'Intermédiaire des généalogistes, "De belgis illustribus. Les quartiers d'ascendance de Philippe Roberts-Jones", n° 167, 1973, p. 328-332. (by Denise Lelarge, Suzanne Roberts-Jones-Goemaere, Estelle van Win, Marcel Bergé, J. Fobe and L. Poplemont)
1981: Paul Legrain, Dictionnaire des Belges, Bruxelles, 1981
2010: Karel Logist, "En poésie avec Dr Roberts et Mr Jones", dans Le Carnet et les Instants, n° 160, Brussels, February/March 2010, p. 19-20

References

External links 
 Biography at the site of the Belgian Royal Academy of French Language and Literature

1924 births
2016 deaths
People from Ixelles
Belgian people of British descent
Barons of Belgium
Belgian art historians
Grand Crosses of the Order of the Crown (Belgium)
Commandeurs of the Légion d'honneur
Commandeurs of the Ordre des Arts et des Lettres
Recipients of the Order of Isabella the Catholic
Members of the Royal Academy of Belgium
Commanders of the Order of Merit of the Italian Republic
Academic staff of the Free University of Brussels (1834–1969)
20th-century Belgian poets
20th-century  Belgian historians
21st-century Belgian poets
21st-century  Belgian historians
Recipients of the Order of the Lion of Finland
Belgian male poets
20th-century Belgian male writers
21st-century Belgian male writers